Witten is a city with almost 100,000 inhabitants in the Ennepe-Ruhr-Kreis (district) in North Rhine-Westphalia, Germany.

Geography
Witten is situated in the Ruhr valley, in the southern Ruhr area.

Bordering municipalities
 Bochum
 Dortmund
 Herdecke
 Wetter (Ruhr)
 Sprockhövel
 Hattingen

Boroughs
Witten is divided into eight boroughs and each borough is further divided into two or more city-districts. Every district has its own district-number:
 Witten-Mitte: 11 Innenstadt, 12 Oberdorf-Helenenberg, 13 Industriegebiet-West, 14 Krone, 15 Crengeldanz, 16 Hauptfriedhof, 17 Stadion, 18 Industriegebiet-Nord, 19 Hohenstein
 Düren: 21 Düren-Nord, 22 Düren-Sued
 Stockum: 31 Stockum-Mitte, 32 Dorney, 33 Stockumer Bruch, 34 Wilhelmshöhe
 Annen: 41 Tiefendorf, 42 Wullen, 43 Annen-Mitte-Nord, 44 Annen-Mitte-Süd, 45 Kohlensiepen, 46 Wartenberg, 47 Gedern
 Rüdinghausen: 51 Industriegebiet-Ost, 52 Rüdinghausen-Mitte, 53 Buchholz, 54 Schnee
 Bommern: 61 Steinhausen, 62 Bommerbank, 63 Bommerfeld, 64 Wettberg, 65 Buschey, 66 Bommeregge
 Heven: 71 Papenholz, 72 Hellweg, 73 Wannen, 74 Heven-Dorf, 75 Lake
 Herbede: 81 Herbede-Ort, 82 Vormholz, 83 Bommerholz-Muttental, 84 Durchholz, 85 Buchholz-Kaempen

Population 1739–2020

History

Witten was first mentioned in historic sources in 1214, however the borough Herbede (which was incorporated into the city in 1975) dates back to 851. The city was a mining town from 1578. In 1946, it was included in North Rhine-Westphalia on its establishment. In 1975 Witten was included in the administrative district Ennepe-Ruhr-Kreis and it is now its biggest city. 1975 was also the year Witten was first counted to have more than 100,000 inhabitants, the threshold to be considered a large city ("Großstadt") in Germany.

Roburit Explosion
In the late 19th century Witten was known for the Roburit dynamite. This dynamite was once used by coal mines around the world. In 1906 an explosion occurred, resulting in the deaths of 41 people.

Politics

In the local elections of 2004 the Social Democratic Party (SPD) was the largest party on the council with 24 seats. It was followed by the Christian Democratic Union (CDU) with 18 and the Alliance 90/The Greens with 7, the WBG (a conservative lis) and Free Democrats with four each, FLW (also a conservative list) with three, National Democratic Party two, and the PDS/WAL (socialists) and AUF Witten (a left wing list) with one each.

From 2004 to 2020, for the first time in its history, the council was led by a female mayor: Sonja Leidemann (SPD). In the election of 2020 she lost her mandate to Lars König (CDU).

Mayor
The current mayor of Witten is Lars König of the Christian Democratic Union (CDU). The most recent mayoral election was held on 13 September 2020, with a runoff held on 27 September, and the results were as follows:

! rowspan=2 colspan=2| Candidate
! rowspan=2| Party
! colspan=2| First round
! colspan=2| Second round
|-
! Votes
! %
! Votes
! %
|-
| bgcolor=| 
| align=left| Sonja Leidemann
| align=left| Social Democratic Party
| 12,365
| 34.5
| 11,365
| 40.0
|-
| bgcolor=| 
| align=left| Lars König
| align=left| Christian Democratic Union
| 10,595
| 29.6
| 17,036
| 60.0
|-
| bgcolor=| 
| align=left| Stefan Borggraefe
| align=left| Pirate Party Germany
| 4,005
| 11.2
|-
| 
| align=left| Martin Strautz
| align=left| Citizens' Forum
| 2,276
| 6.4
|-
| bgcolor=| 
| align=left| Ursula Weiß
| align=left| The Left
| 2,227
| 6.2
|-
| bgcolor=| 
| align=left| Richard Surrey
| align=left| Witten Citzen's Association/Free Voters
| 1,793
| 5.0
|-
| 
| align=left| Michael Hasenkamp
| align=left| CityClimate Witten
| 1,110
| 3.1
|-
| 
| align=left| Hans-Peter Skotarzik
| align=left| Witten.Direct
| 1,052
| 2.9
|-
| bgcolor=| 
| align=left| Norman Kerner
| align=left| Independent
| 397
| 1.1
|-
! colspan=3| Valid votes
! 35,820
! 98.1
! 28,401
! 98.7
|-
! colspan=3| Invalid votes
! 709
! 1.9
! 369
! 1.3
|-
! colspan=3| Total
! 36,529
! 100.0
! 28,770
! 100.0
|-
! colspan=3| Electorate/voter turnout
! 78,110
! 46.8
! 77,920
! 36.9
|-
| colspan=7| Source: City of Witten (1st round, 2nd round)
|}

City council 

The Witten city council governs the city alongside the Mayor. The most recent city council election was held on 13 September 2020, and the results were as follows:

! colspan=2| Party
! Votes
! %
! +/-
! Seats
! +/-
|-
| bgcolor=| 
| align=left| Social Democratic Party (SPD)
| 9,052
| 25.2
|  10.0
| 16
|  9
|-
| bgcolor=| 
| align=left| Christian Democratic Union (CDU)
| 8,349
| 23.2
|  0.3
| 15
|  2
|-
| bgcolor=| 
| align=left| Alliance 90/The Greens (Grüne)
| 7,404
| 20.6
|  7.6
| 13
|  4
|-
| 
| align=left| Citizens' Forum (BF)
| 2,182
| 6.1
|  4.4
| 4
|  3
|-
| bgcolor=| 
| align=left| Alternative for Germany (AfD)
| 1,681
| 4.7
| New
| 3
| New
|-
| bgcolor=| 
| align=left| Pirate Party Germany (Piraten)
| 1,536
| 4.3
|  2.2
| 3
|  1
|-
| bgcolor=| 
| align=left| The Left (Die Linke)
| 1,441
| 4.0
|  2.0
| 3
|  1
|-
| bgcolor=| 
| align=left| Witten Citzens' Association/Free Voters (WGB-FW)
| 1,120
| 3.1
|  0.9
| 2
| ±0
|-
| bgcolor=| 
| align=left| Free Democratic Party (FDP)
| 838
| 2.3
|  0.1
| 2
| ±0
|-
| bgcolor=| 
| align=left| Die PARTEI
| 739
| 2.1
| New
| 1
| New
|-
| 
| align=left| CityClimate Witten (SKW)
| 631
| 1.8
| New
| 1
| New
|-
| 
| align=left| Witten.Direct (W.D)
| 535
| 1.5
| New
| 1
| New
|-
| colspan=7 bgcolor=lightgrey| 
|-
| 
| align=left| Alternative Independent Progressive Witten (AUF)
| 227
| 0.6
|  0.6
| 0
|  1
|-
| bgcolor=| 
| align=left| Ecological Democratic Party (ÖDP)
| 139
| 0.4
| New
| 0
| New
|-
| 
| align=left| Grassroots Democratic List Witten (BLW)
| 87
| 0.2
| New
| 0
| New
|-
| bgcolor=| 
| align=left| Independent Norman Kerner
| 13
| 0.0
| New
| 0
| New
|-
! colspan=2| Valid votes
! 35,974
! 98.5
! 
! 
! 
|-
! colspan=2| Invalid votes
! 547
! 1.5
! 
! 
! 
|-
! colspan=2| Total
! 36,521
! 100.0
! 
! 64
!  8
|-
! colspan=2| Electorate/voter turnout
! 78,108
! 46.8
!  0.4
! 
! 
|-
| colspan=7| Source: City of Witten
|}

State Landtag
In the Landtag of North Rhine-Westphalia, Witten is part of the Ennepe-Ruhr-Kreis II constituency. Nadja Büteführ of the SPD was elected as representative in the 2017 state election. Verena Schäffer of the Greens also ran in the constituency and was elected to the Landtag on her party's state list.

Federal parliament
In the Bundestag, Witten is part of the Ennepe-Ruhr-Kreis II constituency. Axel Echeverria of the SPD was elected as representative in the 2021 German federal election.

Transport

Witten is connected to the Autobahn network by the A 43 and A 44 motorways. It has a central station, connecting the city to the regional-train-network of Deutsche Bahn with direct connections to Hagen, Bochum, Essen, Siegen, Wuppertal, Düsseldorf, Aachen or Dortmund.
Local service is carried out by the BOGESTRA, a joint venture between the cities of Bochum and Gelsenkirchen, to which most of the bus lines in Witten belong. There is a tram line connecting to Bochum. From mid-December on, there will be two tram lines, which will run in Witten (lines 309 and 310). When the new track to Langendreer is completed (September 2020), the tram lines will ride to the station of Bochum-Langendreer (309) or to Wattenscheid-Höntrop via Bochum main station (310). Public transport in the city is carried out according to the fare system of the VRR transport association.

Coat of arms
The coat of arms of Witten with its two lions once belong to the Everhards von Witten-Steinhausen and was first mentioned in 1283. The family of Witten-Steinhausen belongs to the founders of the town of Witten. Their slogan was: "Sigillum Hermanni de Wittene". Because of its long history this coat of arms was the only one in the Ruhr area, that was not forbidden by the Allies in May 1945, after the end of the Second World War.

Culture
 Hebezeug-Museum – a museum dedicated to cranes and hoist founded by J. D. Neuhaus and is located on the Route der Industriekultur.
 Wittener Tage für neue Kammermusik, festival for contemporary chamber music, held annually at the end of April

Twin towns – sister cities

Witten is twinned with:

 Beauvais, France (1975)
 Barking and Dagenham, England, United Kingdom (1979)
 Mallnitz, Austria (1979)
 Lev HaSharon, Israel (1979)
 Bitterfeld-Wolfen, Germany (1990)
 Kursk, Russia (1990)
 Tczew, Poland (1990)
 San Carlos, Nicaragua (1990)
 Mekelle, Ethiopia (2016)

Religions

Roman Catholic
When Witten was first mentioned in historical documents, it was part of the Archdiocese of Cologne. Since 1821 it has been a part of the Diocese of Paderborn; however, the borough of Herbede belongs to the Diocese of Essen. In the 19th century the Ruhr area drew up to 500,000 Poles from East Prussia and Silesia, most of whom were Catholic. Hundreds settled in Witten, leading to a growth in the Catholic community. Today, between 30 and 40 per cent of the population is Catholic.

Protestant
In the 16th century Witten was influenced by Martin Luther's Reformation, and until the late 19th century, Witten was a predominantly Protestant town with just a few Catholic inhabitants. Between 30 and 40 per cent of the population is Protestant today.

Muslims
There are four mosques in Witten, Annen and Herbede today, founded by immigrants from Turkey who arrived in the 1970s and 1980s. Between five and eight per cent of the population is Muslim.

Jews

In 1815 the first Jewish community was mentioned in Witten. In 1938 the synagogue was destroyed during the so-called "Reichspogromnacht" (also known as Kristallnacht) of 9–10 November 1938. Today, only about a dozen Jews live in Witten. They belong to the Jewish community in Dortmund.

Since 1994 the place of the former synagogue is marked with a memorial.

Notable people
 Ingeborg Danz (born 1961), concert singer
 Theodor Detmers (1902–1976), officer
 Felix Dornebusch (born 1994), football player
 Mirko Englich (born 1978), wrestler
 Dennis Eilhoff (born 1982), football player
 Robert Graf (1923–1966), actor
 Martin Geck (1936–2019), musicologist
 Ralf Kapschack (born 1954), politician (SPD)
 Carsten Keuler (born 1971), football player
 Jochen Nickel (born 1959), actor
 Sorina Nwachukwu (born 1987), sprinter
 Paul Pleiger (1899–1985), state adviser and corporate general director
 Alexandra Popp (born 1991), football player
 Andreas Reckwitz (born 1970), sociologist
 Stephan Remmler (born 1949), singer
 Moritz Römling (born 2001), football player
 Otto Schlüter (1872–1959), geographer
 Joseph Schmidt-Görg (1897–1981), musicologist and composer
 Otto Schott (1851–1935), chemist
 Erich Schöppner (1932–2005), boxer
 Michael Schulz (born 1961), football player
 Josef Sieber (1900–1962), film actor
 Wilhelm Utermann (1912–1991), writer and journalist
 Willi Veller (1896–1941), politician (NSDAP)
 Tanja Wedhorn (born 1971), actress
 Charles Paul Wilp (1932–2005), artist and photographer
 Rosi Wolfstein (1888–1987), politician (KPD)

References

 
Holocaust locations in Germany